Katarina is a fictional character played by Adrienne Hill in the long-running British science fiction television series Doctor Who. She is a companion of the First Doctor.

Katarina appeared in the programme from November to December 1965, in five episodes over two stories. For 35 years, none of the episodes to feature her existed in the BBC archives until January 2004 when the second episode of the 12-part serial The Daleks' Master Plan was found.

An inhabitant of ancient Troy, Katarina was very unused to modern concepts: she didn't even know what a key was. Katarina was conceived as a permanent companion but this was quickly re-evaluated by the writers, including producer John Wiles, as they realised the writing challenges that came with such an unworldly character. Unable to remove the character from upcoming scripts at short notice, they decided to write out Katarina by killing her early in The Daleks' Master Plan, her second story, making her the first companion in the series to die. Katarina's death was the first scene Hill filmed for the series.

Her role as companion in The Daleks' Master Plan was given to the character of Sara Kingdom, who was also killed off in the same story.

Character history
Katarina is introduced in the serial The Myth Makers, which takes place during the siege of Troy around 1200 BC. She is a handmaiden of the prophetess Cassandra, who was also the princess of Troy. Before meeting the Doctor she was little more than a slave. During the Myth Makers, she was sent by Cassandra to spy on the First Doctor and his friends, particularly Vicki, known to her as Cressida. Katarina befriends Vicki, who sent her to help the Doctor get Steven back into the TARDIS after a spear thrust had badly injured him. Katarina tended to his wounds and helps the TARDIS crew survive the events of the Troy siege. She joins Steven and the Doctor on their travels while Vicki decides to stay behind in Troy with the warrior Troilus.

A sweet, simple young woman who cannot really cope with the concept that the universe has suddenly opened up to her, Katarina believes that she is dead, and that the Doctor is a god transporting her to the next life. She refers to the TARDIS the "temple" and also the "Place of Perfection", and literally worships the Doctor, referring to him as "Lord" (much to his annoyance) and having absolute faith in him. She believes that the Doctor was the god Zeus and that he had come to take her on a journey in his temple to the real Place of Perfection. Despite the Doctor's protests, she remains set in this belief.

During The Daleks' Master Plan, Katarina is taken hostage by the escaped prisoner Kirksen, who demands that the Doctor take him to Kembel, a planet taken over by the Daleks. To prevent the Doctor giving in to Kirksen's demands, she chooses to trigger the controls to the airlock she is being held in, propelling both herself and her captor into the vacuum of space.

Despite her brief tenure on the series, Katarina is significant for being the first of the Doctor's companions to die on-screen. After the Doctor had defeated the Daleks, Steven said that he had seen too much death lately; the sacrifice of Katarina weighed on his mind, among others.

Other media
Katarina first met the Seventh Doctor when she was a little girl. As the Doctors looked different, she was unaware that they were the same person. She spoke to him of her ambition to serve as a handmaid to a priestess because her poor family could not afford to feed her any longer. The Doctor gave her family a gold coin, which would feed them for a year. However, on learning Katarina's name, the Doctor realized that she would die young as he has already witnessed it in his personal timeline.

Much later, on the ruined world of Adeki, the Seventh Doctor found one of several Gwanzulums, beings who used their shapeshifting powers to pass themselves off as some of the Doctor's past companions, including Katarina. Before he realized the ruse, the false Katarina tried to have him take her off the planet. Later, Ace comes across the ghost of Katarina in the form of an eternally frozen girl of ice, in the Doctor's guilty mind. In Katarina's afterlife, she finds herself without a coin and unable to cross the River Styx. However, due to the intervention of the Doctor (or her idea of him), she found her way not only to Asphodel where all souls who had done neither good nor evil would go, but to the Elysian Fields, the abode of the blessed.

In the novel Timewyrm: Genesys the TARDIS projects her likeness on a screen along with a number of other dead companions to help the Seventh Doctor work out where he needs to go.

Katarina has made a return in Big Finish Productions, portrayed by Ajjaz Awad. In the series Ravenous story "Companion Piece", the kleptomaniac Time Lord known as the Nine attempts to retrieve Katarina's corpse to complete his latest 'collection' of the Doctor's companions, but when he attempts to read Katarina's mind to confirm her identity, the residual artron energy in her body leaves her consciousness 'active' enough for Katarina to distract the Nine so that other companions can defeat him. It is also revealed that Katarina's body had previously been retrieved by River Song, the Doctor's 'wife', who felt that Katarina deserved better than to be left behind like that even if River recognised that the Doctor had no choice.

Katarina plays a more significant return in the audio Daughter of the Gods, when a piloting mistake caused by later companions Jamie McCrimmon and Zoe Heriot causes the Second Doctor's TARDIS to crash into the First's, causing the First Doctor, Steven and Katarina to crash-land on the planet Urbania before they get to Kembel. As a result, the trio spend three months on Kembel while the Doctor constructs a new dematerialisation circuit to repair the damaged TARDIS, with the Doctor giving Katarina some lessons, but when the Second Doctor arrives on Urbania as the Daleks attack the planet, the older Doctor reveals what should have happened before his interference. The First Doctor resolves to find another way, but once the Second explains the situation to Katarina and expresses his regrets, Katarina accepts that there is no other choice and joins him and his companions as they use the First Doctor's repaired dematerialisation circuit to reactivate the Second's TARDIS so that he can undo the earlier mistake. The audio ends with the implication that, while the events have been erased from history with the restoration of the original timeline, the Second Doctor at least retains some memory of what just took place, as he reflects that he will never forget Katarina.

Notes

References
David J. Howe, Mark Stammers Doctor Who: Companions 1995 Virgin Publishing

External links

 Katarina on the BBC's Doctor Who website

Television characters introduced in 1965
Doctor Who companions
Female characters in television
Fictional Greek and Roman slaves
Fiction set in the 13th century BC